Boyd Branch is a stream in Jefferson and St. Francois counties the U.S. state of Missouri. It is a tributary of Plattin Creek.

Boyd Branch has the name of the original owner of the site.

See also
List of rivers of Missouri

References

Rivers of Jefferson County, Missouri
Rivers of St. Francois County, Missouri
Rivers of Missouri